Ivailo Dimitrov (born 8 January 1989) is a retired Bulgarian football midfielder. He began his career in England in the youth systems at Hendon and Brentford and returned to Bulgaria to sign for A Group club Vihren Sandanski in 2008. Dimitrov made his professional debut with the club and returned to England in 2010, to rebuild his career in non-league football.

Club career

Youth years 
Born in Sofia, Bulgaria, Dimitrov began his career in England in the youth setup at Isthmian League Premier Division club Hendon. He was named as Hendon's 2001–02 U13 Player Of The Year. Dimitrov joined the Centre of Excellence at English League One club Brentford in 2004 and in his first season was part of the Brentford youth team which famously beat Premier League club Arsenal (containing first teamers Nicklas Bendtner, Vito Mannone, Anthony Stokes and Alexandre Song) on penalties in the third round of the 2004–05 FA Youth Cup. Under youth team manager Barry Quin, Dimitrov signed a two-year scholarship deal in May 2005, along with future first team players Ross Montague, Karle Carder-Andrews and Lewis Dark.

Dimitrov was included in the Bees' first team squads during the 2006–07 pre-season, scoring in a friendly versus non-league club Harrow Borough 2006. He scored a penalty in a 2–0 win over Rushden & Diamonds in the first round of the 2006–07 FA Youth Cup. Dimitrov was released in the summer of 2007, having never been named in a first team squad. He spent a week training with A Group club Levski Sofia and featured in a friendly versus Lokomotiv Plovdiv in October 2007, but was not offered a contract, despite being recommended to the club by Radostin Kishishev.

Return to Hendon 
Dimitrov re-signed for Hendon in October 2007, linking up with fellow Bulgarians Lyubomir Genchev and Iavor Guentchev. He made the first senior appearance of his career in a 2–0 victory over Carshalton Athletic on 6 October 2007, coming on as an injury time substitute for Davis Haule. He made his first start for the club in a 6–0 Middlesex Senior Cup second round win over Harefield United on 11 December. He scored his first goal for the club in an 11–1 thrashing of Leyton in the following game, netting after coming on as a 72nd-minute substitute for Wayne O'Sullivan. It was Dimitrov's final outing for the club and he left having made four appearances and scored one goal.

Vihren Sandanski 
Dimitrov returned to Bulgaria and secured a move to A Group club Vihren Sandanski prior to the beginning of the 2008–09 season. He made his professional debut on 9 August 2008, starting against Levski Sofia and lasting until being taken off at half time for Joãozinho during the 1–0 win. He made regular appearances during the opening months of the season, before making his final appearance for the club as an injury time substitute in a 3–1 win over Cherno More on 29 November. Dimitrov made 10 league appearances during an unsuccessful 2008–09 season, which saw the club suffer relegation to the B Group.

Non-league nomad

2009–10 
Dimitrov returned to England to sign for Conference South club Maidenhead United in January 2010. Before making his Magpies debut, Dimitrov signed for Southern League Division One Midlands strugglers Aylesbury United on a dual-registration deal and made one appearance for the club in a 5–2 defeat to AFC Sudbury on 6 February. Dimitrov made his Maidenhead debut in a league match versus St Albans City on 9 February, replacing Kieran Knight on 68 minutes. He scored his first goal in a 4–2 Berks & Bucks Senior Cup semi-final win over Thatcham Town on 16 February, with Dimitrov and former Brentford youth colleague Lewis Ochoa netting a goal apiece in extra time. His final competitive Maidenhead appearance came in a 1–1 draw with Dover Athletic on 20 February, replacing Alex Wall after 83 minutes. He made four appearances for Maidenhead, scoring one goal.

2010–11 
After appearing in a pre-season friendly for Maidenhead United against Hayes & Yeading United in July 2010, Dimitrov signed for the Conference Premier outfit before the beginning of the 2010–11 season, linking up with former Brentford players Lewis Ferrell, Josh Lennie and Dexter Burt. He failed to make a competitive appearance for the club and signed for Isthmian League Premier Division club Kingstonian on 21 January 2011. He made his debut in a 2–0 defeat to Cray Wanderers the following day, replacing Reece Jones. Dimitrov's second and final appearance for the club came three days later, when he replaced Antonio Gonella after 61 minutes of a 2–1 win over Maidstone United. Dimitrov resurfaced at Isthmian League First Division South club Walton & Hersham in early April. He made only one appearance for the club, replacing Chris Wales after 51 minutes of a 2–1 defeat to Chipstead on 2 April. Dimitrov's final move of the 2010–11 season saw him join Spartan South Midlands League Premier Division club Broxbourne Borough V & E in mid-April. He made his debut on 16 April, scoring in a 3–2 win over Haringey Borough. His second and final appearance came in a 2–1 defeat to Dunstable Town on 23 April, with Dimitrov again scoring.

2011–12 
Dimitrov re-signed for Broxbourne Borough V & E early in the 2011–12 season. Manager Ashley Fisk stated that due to the strength of the squad, Dimitrov would not be an automatic pick for the first team. He made an appearance in a 7–0 FA Cup first qualifying round thrashing at the hands of Dunstable Town on 17 September. Dimitrov failed to last at Boro and rejoined Aylesbury United in September. Now playing Spartan South Midlands League Premier Division football with the club, Dimitrov made his second debut for the Ducks on 12 October, replacing Tom Barnett after 58 minutes of a 3–1 defeat to Colney Heath. He began the following game against Hanwell Town on the bench and with the Ducks 3–0 up, Dimitrov entered the fray as an 82nd-minute substitute for Stacey Field. He scored his first goal for the club with virtually his first touch and netted again two minutes later in the 6–0 win. He scored again in the following game, bagging a late consolation in a 3–1 Challenge Trophy defeat to Risborough Rangers. He made a rare start in a league match against Hatfield Town on 22 October, but suffered an injury after 50 minutes of the 1–0 defeat. The injury halted his progress and he left the club in January 2012, having made six appearances and scored three goals. Dimitrov moved across the Spartan South Midlands League Premier Division to sign for Berkhamsted in January 2012. He made his debut with a start in a 5–1 win over Hatfield Town on 21 January, but made only one further appearance before departing the club.

2012–13 
Dimitrov signed for Spartan South Midlands League Premier Division club Hanwell Town in August 2012, making his debut in a 4–1 victory over Tring Athletic on 18 August. He managed only two further appearances before returning to Berkhamsted in September. He made only two substitute appearances before departing the Comrades later in the month.

International career 
Dimitrov was capped by Bulgaria at youth level.

Career statistics

References

1989 births
Living people
Association football midfielders
National League (English football) players
Hendon F.C. players
OFC Vihren Sandanski players
Maidenhead United F.C. players
Aylesbury United F.C. players
Association football forwards
Kingstonian F.C. players
Walton & Hersham F.C. players
Broxbourne Borough F.C. players
Berkhamsted Town F.C. players
Hanwell Town F.C. players
Bulgarian expatriate footballers
Bulgarian expatriate sportspeople in England
Bulgarian footballers
First Professional Football League (Bulgaria) players
Isthmian League players
Southern Football League players
Berkhamsted F.C. players